Marco Magnabosco (born 12 August 1995) is an Italian ice hockey player for Asiago Hockey 1935 and the Italian national team.

He represented Italy at the 2021 IIHF World Championship.

References

External links

1995 births
Living people
Asiago Hockey 1935 players
Italian ice hockey right wingers
People from Asiago
Sportspeople from the Province of Vicenza